101 Damnations may refer to:

"101 Dam-Nations", a 1982 single by Scarlet Party
101 Damnations (album), a 1989 album by Carter The Unstoppable Sex Machine

See also
 101 Dalmatians (disambiguation)